The 2016 OFC U-20 Championship was the 21st edition of the OFC U-20 Championship, the biennial international youth football championship organised by the Oceania Football Confederation (OFC) for the men's under-19/under-20 national teams of Oceania. Each national team had to submit a squad of 18 players, two of whom must be goalkeepers.

Players in boldface had been capped at full international level prior to the start of the tournament.

Preliminary round

American Samoa

Head coach:  Sione Mau

Cook Islands

Head coach:  Tuka Tisam

Samoa

Head Coach:  Paul Ualesi

Tonga

Head Coach:  Tevita Moala

Second round
The squads were published by Oceania Football Confederation on 23 August 2016.

Group A

Vanuatu

Head coach:  Etienne Mermer

Fiji

Head coach:  Yogendra Dutt

New Caledonia

Head coach:  Kamali Fitialeata

Papua New Guinea

Head coach:  Peter Gunemba

Group B

Cook Islands

Head coach:  Matt Calcott

New Zealand

Head coach:  Darren Bazeley

Solomon Islands

Head coach:  Pedro Mateo

Tahiti

Head coach:  Ludovic Graugnard

References

OFC U-20 Championship squads